Vijayaraghunatha Sethupathi (died 1720) ruled from 1710 to 1720 the "Ramnad Kingdom", also known as "Maravar Kingdom". He was an adopted son of Raghunatha Kilavan, the founder of the "Ramnad Kingdom". Sethupathi was the title granted by Thanjavur Nayaks to his adoptive father Raghunatha Kilavan, and this title was retained by his descendants.

Personal life 

According to a 1713 letter written by Christian missionary Martin, Vijayaraghunatha Sethupathi was the second son of Raghunatha Kilavan, the founder of the kingdom. Martin writes

Vijayaraghunatha Sethupathi had two daughters: Sivagami Nachiar and Rajeswari Nachiar. The story is that both his daughters fell in love with the same man and the king got them both married to him. He also gave him a small portion of his kingdom to take care of.

Reign 

Vijayaraghunatha Sethupathi became a king after his adoptive father Raghunatha Kilavan chose him as heir apparent on his death bed. Vijayaraghunatha was a ruler of considerable ability. The kingdom was on the brink of a famine when he ascended the throne but he handled the situation appreciably well. He set up his base in the fortress of Aranthangi. With the assistance of French engineers he built a fort at Gundar in Kamudhi in present day Ramanathapuram district.  Being a pious Hindu, Vijayaraghunatha frequently visited the temple at Rameswaram and made donations.

Vijayaraghunatha was initially favourable in his attitude towards Christians. He even made lavish donations for the construction of a church in Aranthangi in 1711. However,  his attitude changed during a visit to Rameswaran in 1714-15, when his brother-in-law, Tiruvaluvanathan, whom he had appointed to govern the state in his absence, visited the church in Aranthangi and participated in Christian ceremonies. This, combined with tales of alleged atrocities of Christian missionaries, turned Vijayaraghunatha against them. He gave orders to exterminate Christianity from the kingdom and prohibited proselytising. There was a ferry service between Ramnathapuram and Rameshwaram. This ferry ride was free of cost for pilgrims and this decree was given by the king. His son in law (Dhandapani Thevar) decided to charge a very small fare for this ferry from pilgrims. Many pilgrims were turned away because they weren't able to afford the ferry which was not free anymore. One such determined pilgrim decided to directly approach the king regarding this matter. This is when it comes to the king's notice that the ferry which is supposed to be free was not free anymore. The king flew into a fit of rage and had his own son-in-law arrested. Meanwhile the king's two daughters once they heard of this decided to come and beg their father to let their husband go. The king, however, had already passed a death sentence on his son in law. While the women were on their way, they get the news that their way to meet their father they find out that their husband had been beheaded. They kill themselves in that very same spot. The place where the first daughter died is called Akkamadam and where his second daughter died is called Thangachimadam.

Vijayaraghunatha's rival, Bhavani Shankar, broke into an open revolt in 1720 and along with Raja of Pudukkottai and the Thanjavur Maratha ruler invaded Aranthangi. While defending the city, Vijayaraghunatha fell victim to plague. His death triggered a civil war in the kingdom at the end of which, the kingdom was partitioned into three and lost most of its power and territory.

See also
 Ramnad Kingdom
 Sethupathi, title of Raghunatha Kilavan and his descendants
 Maravar, community to which Ramnad / Sethupathi kings belonged 
 Thanjavur Nayak kingdom, once and ally and later adversary of Sethupathis
 Madurai Nayak dynasty, once and ally and later adversary of Sethupathis
 Marava War of Succession, war of succession after Vijaya Raghunatha Sethupathi

References 

 

1720 deaths
History of Tamil Nadu
Year of birth unknown